Team Dunedin is a local body ticket which contests local elections in Dunedin, New Zealand.

Leadership and policies
It is led by Jules Radich, the mayor of Dunedin. Radich describes the ticket as centrist, encompassing ideas from both the left and right of politics.

History
Team Dunedin was formed by Dunedin City councillor Jules Radich to contest the 2022 Dunedin mayoral and Dunedin City Council elections. Other members of Team Dunedin have included business owner Brent Weatherall, ACT Party candidate Callum Steele-MacIntosh, Otago Peninsula Community Board member and school teacher Cheryl Neill, restaurant proprietor Riah McLean, and Dunedin City councillor Andrew Whiley.

On 8 October, Radich was elected as Mayor of Dunedin, defeating the incumbent Aaron Hawkins who stood on the Green Party ticket. Whiley was also re-elected to the Dunedin City Council on the Team Dunedin ticket. In addition, two fellow Team Dunedin members Weatherall and Kelvin Gilbert were elected to the Council.

References

2022 establishments in New Zealand
Political groupings in New Zealand
Politics of Dunedin